The women's 30 kilometre mass start freestyle cross-country skiing competition at the 2014 Sochi Olympics took place on 22 February at Laura Biathlon & Ski Complex. Three Norwegian athletes, Marit Bjørgen, Therese Johaug, and Kristin Størmer Steira, took the lead from 1 km on and skied in the group, never being threatened by other competitors. At the finish line, Bjørgen won gold, Johaug finished second, and Størmer Steira was third. This is the first gold for Norway in women's 30 km race, and the first clean sweep in Olympic cross country skiing since 1992. For Bjørgen, this was the sixth Winter Olympic gold medal, which, together with Lidiya Skoblikova and Lyubov Yegorova, made her a woman with the largest number of Winter Olympics gold medals won. Størmer Steira won her first individual Olympic medal. The defending 2010 champion Justyna Kowalczyk did not finish.

Qualification
An athlete with a maximum of 100 FIS distance points (the A standard) will be allowed to compete in both or one of the event (sprint/distance). An athlete with a maximum 120 FIS sprint points will be allowed to compete in the sprint event and 10 km for women or 15 km for men provided their distance points do not exceed 300 FIS points. NOC's who do not have any athlete meeting the A standard can enter one competitor of each sex (known as the basic quota) in only 10 km classical event for women or 15 km classical event for men. They must have a maximum of 300 FIS distance points at the end of qualifying on January 20, 2014. The qualification period began in July 2012.

Results
The race started at 13:30.

References

Women's cross-country skiing at the 2014 Winter Olympics
Women's 30 kilometre cross-country skiing at the Winter Olympics